Kaempferide is an O-methylated flavonol, a type of chemical compound. It can be found in Kaempferia galanga (aromatic ginger). It has been noted to inhibit pancreatic cancer growth by blockading an EGFR-related pathway.

Metabolism 
The enzyme kaempferol 4'-O-methyltransferase uses S-adenosyl-L-methionine and kaempferol to produce S-adenosyl-L-homocysteine and kaempferide.

Glycosides 
Icariin is the tert-amyl alcohol derivative of kaempferide 3,7-O-diglycoside.

References

External links 
 Kaempferide at the HMDB

O-methylated flavonols